Hugh David (17 July 1925 – 11 September 1987) was a British actor turned television director. David was born in Aberystwyth, Wales.  His directorial credits include Compact, Z-Cars, The Pallisers and Doctor Who, for which he directed two stories in the Patrick Troughton era. While still an actor in the early 1960s, he had actually been suggested for the leading role in Doctor Who by his friend, the producer Rex Tucker, but this was vetoed by incoming series producer Verity Lambert who considered the actor too young for the role. David later stated that as he had recently starred in the Granada Television series Knight Errant and disliked the high public profile it brought him, he would not have been keen to take on another leading role anyway.  He died in London, leaving his widow actress Wendy Williams.

Selected filmography
 How Green Was My Valley (1960)
 Wives and Daughters (1971)

External links 
 

1925 births
1987 deaths
People from Aberystwyth
Welsh television directors
People educated at Friars School, Bangor
Welsh television actors
Welsh film actors